"Are We All We Are" is a song by American singer-songwriter Pink from her sixth studio album The Truth About Love (2012). It was released as the albums sixth and final single on October 31, 2013. The song was written by Pink, her long time collaborator Butch Walker, John Hill and Emile Haynie.

Background
In late February, 2012, Pink released a statement on Twitter that she had begun work on her sixth studio album, and it would be released sometime that year. "Are We All We Are" was written in 2012 with her long time collaborator, Butch Walker. Pink stated that she thought "Are We All We Are" was the perfect tour opener, although performed in the middle of the set on her tour.

Critical reception
Slant Magazine referred to it as "a crunchy call to arms with an infectious hook that turns the title into a wordless chant".

Music video
The official music video for the song was released on October 28, 2013 and it includes footage of her The Truth About Love Tour.

Chart performance
"Are We All We Are" peaked at number 82 on the German Airplay Chart (GER) on the week of November 29, 2013.

References

Pink (singer) songs
2012 songs
Songs written by Pink (singer)
Songs written by Butch Walker
Songs written by Emile Haynie
Songs written by John Hill (record producer)